Ornes is a commune in the Meuse department in Grand Est in north-eastern France. The village is one of the nine French villages destroyed in the First World War and one of six that was never rebuilt. It's now a memorial place.

Even though a few houses and a handful of permanent residents remain, the village is classified as having "died for France".

Population

In 2018, the commune had 6 inhabitants.

Geography 
Ornes is located on departmental road 24, about 12 km to the north-east of Verdun. 
The source of the Orne river is in the commune.

The village is on the border of the Verdun forest where thousands of shells fell during World War I.

See also 
 Zone rouge (First World War)
 List of French villages destroyed in World War I
 Communes of the Meuse department

References

Communes of Meuse (department)
Former populated places in France